Troper may refer to:

 Morris C. Troper (1892–1962), Jewish-American accountant and US Army officer who helped save Jews from the Holocaust
 a member of TV Tropes
 Troper(s) (possibly related to Byzantine-Greek troparion), manuscript(s) containing musical tropes, such as the Winchester Troper